Sir Eric Matthew Gairy PC (18 February 192223 August 1997) was the first Prime Minister of Grenada, serving from his country's independence in 1974 until his overthrow in a coup by Maurice Bishop in 1979. Gairy also served as head of government in pre-independence Grenada as Chief Minister from 1961 to 1962, and as Premier from 1967 to 1974.

Early days in Grenada: 1922–41 
Eric Matthew Gairy was the son of Douglas and Theresa Gairy, and was born 18 February 1922 in Dunfermline, St. Andrew's Parish on the eastern side of the island near Grenville, Grenada. He attended the LaFillette School and then the St. Andrews Roman Catholic Senior School. He was also an acolyte at St. Andrew's Roman Catholic Church, next door to the school. He became a primary "student-teacher" in the LaFillette School from January 1939 to September 1941. He moved to Aruba where he worked several years in the oil refinery of the Lago Oil and Transport Company.

Trade union leader and "Red Sky": 1950–51 
Eric Gairy returned to Grenada in December, 1949 to enter trade unionism and politics. In 1950 he founded the Grenada Manual & Mental Workers Union (GMMWU) and was deeply involved in encouraging the 1951 general strike for better working conditions. This sparked great unrest - so many buildings were set ablaze that the disturbances became known as the "red sky" days - and the British authorities had to call in military reinforcements to help regain control of the situation. Gairy himself was taken into custody.

Radical political leader: 1951–61 
In 1950, Gairy founded the Grenada United Labour Party. He was elected as a representative of the Colony of Grenada's Legislative Council in 1951, 1954, and 1957. He was banned from political activities and lost his seat between 1957 and 1961.

Chief Minister: 1961–62 
Gairy was returned in a by-election in July 1961 and became Chief Minister, as his party held a majority in the Legislative Council since winning the 1961 general election. He served as Chief Minister and Minister of Finance from August 1961 until April 1962 when he was dismissed by the British colonial Governor for the questionable use of state funds.

Leader of the Opposition: 1962–67 
Gairy's party lost the 1962 general election and he served as leader of the opposition between 1962 and 1967.

Premier: 1967–74

First administration: 1967–72 
Gairy won the 1967 general election and formed a new administration as Premier of the Associated State of Grenada.

Miss World controversy 
In the 1970 Miss World pageant in London, controversy followed after Grenadian contestant Jennifer Hosten won, and another black contestant from South Africa placed second. Since Gairy was on the judging panel, inevitably there were many accusations that the contest had been rigged. The BBC and newspapers received numerous protests about the result, and accusations of racism were made by all sides. Four of the nine judges had given first-place votes to Miss Sweden, Marjorie Christel Johansson, while Miss Grenada received only two firsts, yet Johansson finished fourth. Some of the audience gathered in the street outside Royal Albert Hall after the contest and chanted "Swe-den, Swe-den". Four days later, organising director Julia Morley (1941-) resigned because of the intense pressure from the newspapers. Years later Johansson was reported as saying that she had been cheated out of the title.

Second administration 1972–74 
Gairy won the 1972 general election and formed a new administration as Premier of the Associated State of Grenada.

Prime Minister: 1974–79

First administration: 1974–76 
Gairy became the first Prime Minister of Grenada when Grenada achieved independence from Great Britain on 7 February 1974. Gairy's term in office coincided with civil strife in Grenada. The political environment was highly charged, with Gairy's secret police, the Mongoose Gang, terrorizing opponents.

Second administration: 1976–79 
Gairy's party narrowly won the 1976 election but the result was declared fraudulent by international observers due to intimidation of the opposition by Gairy's secret police, known as the Mongoose Gang.

On 27 November 1978, Eric Gairy led a group including scientists and an astronaut in addressing the United Nations on the subject of UFOs.

US citizens helped to support the overthrow of Eric Gairy with solidarity movements. One such solidarity movement existed in San Antonio, Texas and was headed by African-American activist Mario Marcel Salas, who was active in his overthrow on a number of levels. Civil strife took the form of street violence between government supporters, including the Mongoose Gang, and gangs organized by the New Jewel Movement (NJM). In the late 1970s, the NJM began planning to overthrow the government, with party members receiving military training outside of Grenada.

In 1979, a rumour circulated that Gairy would use the Gang to eliminate leaders of the New Jewel Movement while he was out of the country. In response, Bishop overthrew Gairy in March of that year while the latter was visiting the United States.

On 13 March 1979, while Gairy was at the UN, the New Jewel Movement led by Maurice Bishop launched an armed revolution and overthrew the government. Bishop suspended the constitution, and the New Jewel Movement ruled the country by decree until 1983.
Anti-Gairy activity was carried out in the United States in support of the revolution to overthrow Gairy including activists in San Antonio, Texas.

Exile in the United States: 1979–83 
Gairy stayed in exile in the United States until 1983, when the United States, backed by some Caribbean allies - notably, Dame Eugenia Charles, Prime Minister of Dominica and Edward Seaga, Prime Minister of Jamaica - invaded to topple a military government which had overthrown and killed Bishop.

Return and final days: 1983–97 
Gairy then returned to Grenada and campaigned in the elections of 1984, claiming to be a changed man. However, his party lost the elections, winning 36% of the popular vote but only a single seat in the House of Representatives. Attempts by Gairy and his party to return to power in 1990 and 1995 were also unsuccessful. He died in Grand Anse, Grenada.

See also 
 History of Grenada
 Sir Eric Matthew Gairy Botanical Gardens

References 

1922 births
1997 deaths
Members of the House of Representatives of Grenada
Members of the Privy Council of the United Kingdom
Prime Ministers of Grenada
Finance ministers of Grenada
Grenada United Labour Party politicians
Knights Bachelor
Grenadian Roman Catholics
Leaders ousted by a coup
People from Saint Andrew Parish, Grenada
Ufologists
Grenadian expatriates
Expatriates in Aruba
20th-century Grenadian politicians